Dongyinglu Station is a station on Line 1 of the Hohhot Metro. It opened on 29 December 2019.

References

Hohhot Metro stations
Railway stations in China opened in 2019